"Bulletproof" is a song by American singer Raheem DeVaughn, it is the first single from his third studio album, The Love & War MasterPeace (2010). This song features rapper Ludacris, and samples Curtis Mayfield's "The Other Side of Town".

Music video
The music video was directed by Todd Angkasuwan and released across the web via DeVaughn's blog on October 23, 2009. It premiered on BET on December 8, 2009.

Charts

References
Raheem DeVaughn's official internet site
Raheem DeVaughn's Bulletprrof Music Video ft. Ludacris

2009 singles
2009 songs
Raheem DeVaughn songs
Ludacris songs
Jive Records singles
Songs written by Ludacris
Songs written by Curtis Mayfield